Durvillaea chathamensis is a large, robust species of southern bull kelp endemic to the Chatham Islands of New Zealand.

Distribution
Durvillaea chathamensis is endemic to the Chatham Islands of New Zealand.

References

External links
 Algaebase: Durvillaea chathamensis C.H.Hay
 Museum of New Zealand Te Papa Tongarewa: Durvillaea chathamensis C.H.Hay (Species)

Fucales
Flora of New Zealand
Edible seaweeds
Species described in 1979